C. L. Wilson is a best-selling cross-genre American author. She is known for her 5-part Romance and High Fantasy books The Tairen Soul Series, as well as her ongoing Weather "Mages of Mystral" series. In addition to this, Wilson has also written a collection of science fiction short stories titled Futuristic Romance. She has also collaborated with authors Erica Ridley and Elissa Wilds on the short story collection One Enchanted Season.

Her most widely held book, is in 903 libraries, according to WorldCat

References

American women novelists
Living people
American romantic fiction novelists
American fantasy writers
Women romantic fiction writers
Women science fiction and fantasy writers
21st-century American novelists
21st-century American women writers
Year of birth missing (living people)